Six Days a Week (known in France as Le Partage de Catherine) is a 1965 Italian comedy film directed by Luigi Comencini and starring Catherine Spaak. It was adapted from the play by Diego Fabbri.

Plot
Maria is a young beauty who is busy juggling three boyfriends (a count, a dentist and a student) at the same time. She manages this elaborate deception by impersonating her roommate Silvana who is a real life airline hostess. She lies to the count and the dentist about her flight schedules and her whereabouts so she can spend three days a week with each of them. She spends the remaining day of the week with the student who thinks she is a fellow student named Maria. One day the news of the real Silvana's flight disappearance breaks out and she is presumed dead. Comedy and confusion ensure when Maria is forced to come up with a more elaborate scheme to cover her tracks and keep her boyfriends happy.

Cast
Catherine Spaak as  Maria / Silvana / Caterina
Enrico Maria Salerno as   Count Adriano Silveri
Marc Michel  as  Arturo Santini
Riccardo Cucciolla
Manuel Miranda as  Gianni Moraldi
José Calvo
Nando Angelini
Mara Fernández
Janine Reynaud
Daina Saronni
Grazia Martini
Giuseppe Ranieri
Mario De Gual

External links
 

1965 films
1960s Italian-language films
1965 comedy films
Films set in Rome
Italian comedy films
Films scored by Benedetto Ghiglia
1960s Italian films